Solidago juliae, known as Julia's goldenrod, is a plant native to central and western Texas (trans-Pecos and Edwards Plateau regions), as well as southern Arizona, Chihuahua, Coahuila and Nuevo León. It occurs in grasslands, woodlands, and on freshwater shores.

Solidago juliae is a perennial herb sometimes as much as 250 cm (100 inches or 8 1/3 feet) tall. One plant can produce as many as 950 yellowflower heads, borne in a large showy panicle at the top of the plant. Each head contains 9-15 ray florets surrounding 5-9 disc florets.

Species is named for Julia Wells Nesom.

References

External links
Photo of herbarium specimen at Missouri Botanical Garden, collected in Kerr County in Texas in 1989 by Guy L. Nesom and Julia Nesom, isotype of Solidago juliae
Photo of herbarium specimen at Missouri Botanical Garden, collected in Chihuahua in 1852

juliae
Flora of the Southwestern United States
Plants described in 1989
Flora of Mexico